The Sigma 24mm f/1.8 EX DG is wide-angle lens which features a fast f/1.8 maximum aperture for use in low-light situations, and macro focusing capability to a reproduction ratio of 1:2.7. It uses aspherical lens elements. Though intended for 35mm film and full-frame digital SLRs, this lens is available for several makes of APS-C digital SLR cameras, where the angle of view is similar to a moderate wide-angle lens (in the 35mm-40mm range, depending on the size of the D-SLR sensor).

This lens is capable of macro photography, with minimum focusing down to 18 cm/7.1" (reproduction ratio 1:2.7). It incorporates a floating focus system in order to minimize distortion, spherical aberration and astigmatism, and provides high performance at all shooting distances. The high reproduction ratio and wide angle of view allow capturing high quality images not only of a subject but also the surrounding scenery.

The Lens was introduced in 2001.

References

External links 
 official page

024mm f/1.8 EX DG